The Honorable Mr Patrick Assirvaden, is a Mauritian politician, actual President of the Labour Party (Mauritius) and former president of the Central Electricity Board of Mauritius, serving as member of parliament. He has been elected in constituency No.15 La Caverne and Phoenix, during the Mauritian general elections of 2019, under the Labour Party (Mauritius).

References 

Mauritian politicians
Living people
Year of birth missing (living people)
Mauritian Creoles
Mauritian politicians of Indian descent